Nathan Bastian (born December 6, 1997) is a Canadian professional ice hockey right winger for the New Jersey Devils of the National Hockey League (NHL). He was selected by the Devils in the second round, 41st overall, in the 2016 NHL Entry Draft.

Playing career
Bastian played at the midget level with the Brantford Jr. B Stars in the Greater Ontario Junior Hockey League after he was selected 127th overall in the 2013 OHL Priority Draft by the Mississauga Steelheads. He joined the Steelheads during the 2013–14 season, to contribute 2 goals in 21 games.

Bastian was drafted by the New Jersey Devils in the second round of the 2016 NHL Entry Draft and later signed to a three-year, entry-level contract on October 20, 2016.

During the 2018–19 season, after 43 games with the Devils' AHL affiliate in Binghamton, Bastian received his first recall to New Jersey on January 19, 2019. He made his NHL debut that night, getting into his first fight against Josh Manson in a 3–2 loss to the Anaheim Ducks at the Prudential Center. With the All-Star break approaching, Bastian was returned to the AHL following his lone appearance. On February 25, Bastian scored his first NHL goal in a 2–1 win against the Montreal Canadiens. On June 15, 2021, Bastian was re-signed to a two-year contract by the Devils.

On July 21, 2021, Bastian was selected from the Devils at the 2021 NHL Expansion Draft by the Seattle Kraken. Remaining on the Kraken's opening roster for the 2021–22 season, Bastian in a fourth-line role added a physical edge and appeared in 12 games with the expansion club, scoring his lone goal for the team in a 5–4 loss to the Arizona Coyotes on November 6, 2021. Having been demoted as a healthy scratch, Bastian returned to the Devils after being placed on waivers by the Kraken on November 25.

Career statistics

Awards and honours

References

External links
 

1997 births
Living people
Binghamton Devils players
Canadian ice hockey right wingers
Mississauga Steelheads players
New Jersey Devils draft picks
New Jersey Devils players
Seattle Kraken players